Kristee Porter (born May 7, 1980) is a United States volleyball player, and coach.

She participated at the 2002 FIVB World Grand Prix.

Porter is the head coach of the North Texas Mean Green volleyball team, which is a member of Conference USA. She was hired to lead the program on December 26, 2021.

Porter played for University of California, Los Angeles. She coached for University of Colorado, Navarro College, and Robert E. Lee High School.

On November 1, 2019, Porter was inducted into the UCLA Athletics Hall of Fame as a three-sport participant. She was on the women's volleyball, basketball, track & field teams.

References

External links 
 Kristee Porter at FIVB
 

1969 births
Living people
American women's volleyball players
Place of birth missing (living people)
Wing spikers
African-American volleyball players
21st-century African-American people
21st-century African-American women
20th-century African-American sportspeople
UCLA Bruins women's volleyball players
20th-century African-American women